Vasilios Baxevanos (born 23 October 1993) is a Greek professional footballer who plays as a defensive midfielder.

References

1993 births
Living people
Greek footballers
Greek expatriate footballers
Football League (Greece) players
Cypriot Second Division players
Gamma Ethniki players
Panachaiki F.C. players
Paniliakos F.C. players
Pierikos F.C. players
PAEEK players
Diagoras F.C. players
Egaleo F.C. players
Enosi Panaspropyrgiakou Doxas players
Association football midfielders
People from Aalen
Sportspeople from Stuttgart (region)